Andrea Bernasconi (c. 1706 – 24 January 1784) was an Italian composer.

He began his career in his native country as a composer of operas. In 1755 he was appointed to the post of Kapellmeister at the Bavarian court in Munich where he produced several more operas successfully and a few symphonies. After 1772 his compositional output consisted of entirely sacred music. He was the stepfather of soprano Antonia Bernasconi.

References

External links

 

1706 births
1784 deaths
Italian Classical-period composers
Italian Baroque composers
Italian male classical composers
Italian opera composers
Male opera composers
18th-century Italian composers
18th-century Italian male musicians